USNS Contender (T-AGOS-2) was a Stalwart-class Modified Tactical Auxiliary General Ocean Surveillance Ship of the United States Navy. Now known as the T/S General Rudder, the ship serves as the primary training vessel of Texas A&M Maritime Academy. Texas A&M has operated the vessel since 2012.

History 

Stalwart-class ships were originally designed to collect underwater acoustical data in support of Cold War antisubmarine warfare operations in the 1980s. These vessels were designed to create minimal noise while operating. The addition of cavitation-free propellers at speeds under three knots, the absence of reduction gears in the propulsion system, sound isolation of diesel generators, and vibration dampening of all machinery helped in the Contender'''s mission as an acoustical data sounder.  In 1992, the ex-Contender became the T/V Kings Pointer, the flagship and training vessel of the United States Merchant Marine Academy.

In 1999, Kings Pointer was the first vessel to reach the site of the crash of EgyptAir Flight 990. In the spring of 2004, she underwent a major overhaul to upgrade her crew's quarters and training equipment. The aft 'tow' deck was also modified and any vestige of her previous employment as a SURTASS ship was removed and reworked.

She remained the flagship and training ship of the United States Merchant Marine Academy until January 2012. She was then transferred to Texas A&M University at Galveston and renamed the "TS General Rudder" (after General James Earl Rudder), where she remains today as the primary training vessel for cadets of the Texas A&M Maritime Academy. In 2013, the vessel had another major overhaul, with the aft fantail's bulwark lowered, aft main deck leveled, and hull cleaned and repainted. The vessel was also fitted with additional berthing for 64 personnel.

In 2019, the ship underwent another overhaul, with engine-room improvements, steel repair, rust removal, and the hull cleaned and repainted. This maintenance session came with eagerness, after months of technical and mechanical issues had plagued the vessel. For the first time since being transferred to Texas A&M Maritime Academy, the ship was given a maroon-and-white paint scheme, indicative of Texas A&M school colors. The new improvements have seen promising results for the aging training vessel, as she reached a maximum speed of 14 knots while in transit from her Mobile shipyard. In June 2019, the T/S General Rudder had another underway period before being stationed in the Beaumont Ready Reserve Fleet for the remainder of the summer.

 Incidents 
In September 2018, the T/S General Rudder suffered a rudder failure while entering Port Arthur. The vessel was unable to lower anchor and was purposely run aground minutes later so as to avoid a collision with other ship traffic. With the help of the US Coast Guard and local tug boats, the General Rudder'' was towed to a local shipyard for repairs. Although the vessel's rudder stock had not previously shown signs of wear, it was apparent in the crew's inspection that the heat of the shifting rudder had forced the stock to seize in its casing, causing the unexpected rudder malfunction. The issue was corrected, and the vessel returned to Texas A&M Maritime Academy two weeks later.

Gallery

References

External links 
Training Ship GENERAL RUDDER - TAMUG

NavSource

 

Stalwart-class ocean surveillance ships
Cold War auxiliary ships of the United States
Training ships of the United States
Ships built by Tacoma Boatbuilding Company
1983 ships